The Trentino Basket Cup is an annual friendly basketball tournament hosted by the Italian national basketball team. The tournament consists of four teams and is held in Trento.

Editions

2019 Edition 
Four teams took part in the 2019 edition of the Trentino Basket Cup: Ivory Coast and Italy, that were preparing for the World Cup. While Romania and Switzerland were preparing for the Eurobasket 2021.

External links
Official website

Italy national basketball team
International basketball competitions hosted by Italy
Italy at the 2019 FIBA Basketball World Cup
Basketball competitions in Europe between national teams
Trento